Carey High School is a public high school in Carey, Ohio.  It is the only high school in the Carey Exempted Village Schools district.  Their nickname is the Blue Devils.  They are members of the Northern 10 Athletic Conference.

Ohio High School Athletic Association State Championships

 Boys Football – 1975 (Class A), 2021 (Division VI)

Notes and references

External links
 District Website

High schools in Wyandot County, Ohio
Public high schools in Ohio